James Cerretani and Maxime Cressy were the defending champions but chose to compete with different partners. Cerretani partnered Dustin Brown but lost in the semifinals to Lloyd Glasspool and Alex Lawson. Cressy partnered Albano Olivetti but lost in the first round to Marc-Andrea Hüsler and Kamil Majchrzak.

Hüsler and Majchrzak won the title after defeating Glasspool and Lawson 6–3, 1–6, [20–18] in the final.

Seeds

Draw

References

External links
 Main draw

Tennis Challenger Hamburg - Doubles